The arrondissement of Figeac is an arrondissement of France in the Lot department in the Occitanie region. It has 118 communes.

Composition

The communes of the arrondissement of Figeac, and their INSEE codes, are:

 Albiac (46002)
 Anglars (46004)
 Assier (46009)
 Autoire (46011)
 Aynac (46012)
 Bagnac-sur-Célé (46015)
 Bannes (46017)
 Béduer (46021)
 Belmont-Bretenoux (46024)
 Bessonies (46338)
 Biars-sur-Cère (46029)
 Le Bourg (46034)
 Boussac (46035)
 Le Bouyssou (46036)
 Brengues (46039)
 Bretenoux (46038)
 Cadrieu (46041)
 Cahus (46043)
 Cajarc (46045)
 Calvignac (46049)
 Cambes (46051)
 Camboulit (46052)
 Camburat (46053)
 Capdenac (46055)
 Carayac (46056)
 Cardaillac (46057)
 Corn (46075)
 Cornac (46076)
 Cuzac (46085)
 Durbans (46090)
 Espagnac-Sainte-Eulalie (46093)
 Espédaillac (46094)
 Espeyroux (46096)
 Estal (46097)
 Faycelles (46100)
 Felzins (46101)
 Figeac (46102)
 Flaujac-Gare (46104)
 Fons (46108)
 Fourmagnac (46111)
 Frayssinhes (46115)
 Frontenac (46116)
 Gagnac-sur-Cère (46117)
 Gintrac (46122)
 Girac (46123)
 Glanes (46124)
 Gorses (46125)
 Gréalou (46129)
 Grèzes (46131)
 Issendolus (46132)
 Issepts (46133)
 Labastide-du-Haut-Mont (46135)
 Labathude (46139)
 Lacapelle-Marival (46143)
 Ladirat (46146)
 Larnagol (46155)
 Larroque-Toirac (46157)
 Latouille-Lentillac (46159)
 Latronquière (46160)
 Lauresses (46161)
 Laval-de-Cère (46163)
 Lentillac-Saint-Blaise (46168)
 Leyme (46170)
 Linac (46174)
 Lissac-et-Mouret (46175)
 Livernon (46176)
 Loubressac (46177)
 Lunan (46180)
 Marcilhac-sur-Célé (46183)
 Mayrinhac-Lentour (46189)
 Molières (46195)
 Montbrun (46198)
 Montet-et-Bouxal (46203)
 Montredon (46207)
 Planioles (46221)
 Prendeignes (46226)
 Prudhomat (46228)
 Puybrun (46229)
 Puyjourdes (46230)
 Quissac (46233)
 Reilhac (46235)
 Reyrevignes (46237)
 Rudelle (46242)
 Rueyres (46243)
 Sabadel-Latronquière (46244)
 Saignes (46246)
 Saint-Bressou (46249)
 Saint-Céré (46251)
 Saint-Chels (46254)
 Saint-Cirgues (46255)
 Sainte-Colombe (46260)
 Saint-Félix (46266)
 Saint-Hilaire (46269)
 Saint-Jean-de-Laur (46270)
 Saint-Jean-Lagineste (46339)
 Saint-Jean-Lespinasse (46271)
 Saint-Jean-Mirabel (46272)
 Saint-Laurent-les-Tours (46273)
 Saint-Maurice-en-Quercy (46279)
 Saint-Médard-de-Presque (46281)
 Saint-Médard-Nicourby (46282)
 Saint-Michel-Loubéjou (46284)
 Saint-Paul-de-Vern (46286)
 Saint-Perdoux (46288)
 Saint-Pierre-Toirac (46289)
 Saint-Simon (46292)
 Saint-Sulpice (46294)
 Saint-Vincent-du-Pendit (46295)
 Sauliac-sur-Célé (46299)
 Sénaillac-Latronquière (46302)
 Sonac (46306)
 Sousceyrac-en-Quercy (46311)
 Tauriac (46313)
 Terrou (46314)
 Teyssieu (46315)
 Thémines (46318)
 Théminettes (46319)
 Viazac (46332)

History

The arrondissement of Figeac was created in 1800. At the January 2017 reorganisation of the arrondissements of Lot, it gained two communes from the arrondissement of Cahors.

As a result of the reorganisation of the cantons of France which came into effect in 2015, the borders of the cantons are no longer related to the borders of the arrondissements. The cantons of the arrondissement of Figeac were, as of January 2015:

 Bretenoux
 Cajarc
 Figeac-Est
 Figeac-Ouest
 Lacapelle-Marival
 Latronquière
 Livernon
 Saint-Céré
 Sousceyrac

References

Figeac